List of Ministers of Finance of Cape Verde since independence:

Amaro Alexandre da Luz, 1975 – 1977
Osvaldo Lopes da Silva, 1977 – 1986
Pedro Verona Rodrigues Pires, 1986 – 1990
Arnaldo Carlos de Vasconcelos França, 1990 – 1991
José Tomas Whanon de Carvalho Veiga, 1992 – 1995
Úlpio Napoleão Fernandes, 1995 – 1997
Gualberto do Rosário, 1997 – 1999
Ulisses Correia e Silva, 1999 – 2001
Carlos Augusto Duarte de Burgo, 2001 – 2003
José Maria Neves, 2003 – 2004
João António Pinto Serra, 2004 – 2006
Cristina Lopes da Silva Monteiro Duarte, 2006 – 2016
Olavo Correia, May 2016 –

See also
Economy of Cape Verde

External links
Official website

References

Finance ministers of Cape Verde
Ministers of Finance
Finance Ministers
Politicians
Ministers of Finance